Culgoa may refer to:

Locations
 Culgoa National Park, north-west New South Wales, Australia
 Culgoa River, northern New South Wales, Australia
 Culgoa Floodplain National Park, south-west Queensland, Australia
 Culgoa, town of north-west Victoria, Australia

Other uses